This is a comparison list of intercontinental ballistic missiles developed by various countries.

ICBMs by country

Legend for launch system status in below table:

See also
 Intercontinental ballistic missile
 List of ICBMs
 List of missiles

Notes

References

Intercontinental ballistic missiles